EC 20058-5234 (QU Telescopii), is a star in the constellation Telescopium. With an apparent magnitude of 15.03, it's impossible to detect with the naked eye and requires a powerful telescope to be seen; this degenerate object is located 388 light years from the Solar System based on parallax.

QU Telescopii has a classification of DB2, which states it's a white dwarf with He I lines present in its atmosphere. At the moment, it has 56.9% the mass of the Sun, but a high surface gravity suggests QU Telescopii has a low radius. It has an effective temperature of 24,843 K, which gives it a blue hue as opposed to a white hue. QU Telescopii belongs to a class of stars known as V777 Herculis variables or DBV stars. First noticed in the Edinburgh-Cape Blue Object Survey published in 1992, it  was found to be variable in 1995.

References

Telescopium (constellation)
Pulsating white dwarfs
Telescopii, QU
White dwarfs